The Women's World Chess Championship 2010 took place in Antakya, Turkey from December 2 through 24, 2010.

The tournament, like the previous ones, was played in a 64-player knock-out format. Each pairing consisted of two games, one with white and one with black, from which the winner advanced. In case of a tie, tiebreaks were played the next day, consisting of two rapid games and—if still tied—an Armageddon match. The final consisted of four games at classical time control, if necessary followed by four rapid tiebreak games.

The title was won by Hou Yifan from China who beat her compatriot Ruan Lufei in the final by 5–3, at 16 years of age making her the youngest Women's World Chess Champion in history.

Participants
Players were seeded by their Elo ratings (November 2010 list), except that defending champion Alexandra Kosteniuk was the No. 1 seed.

Qualification paths

Notable absentees
The number one woman in the world, Judit Polgár, never competed for the women's title and did not enter this time either. World number five, Nadezhda Kosintseva, did not play either, although her sister Tatiana (ranked 4th) did. Other names missing from the top 20 were: Irina Krush (17th), former finalist Alisa Galliamova (19th) and ex-champion Xu Yuhua (20th).

Iweta Rajlich and Arianne Caoili were listed as participants but unable to attend; their scheduled opponents, Jovanka Houska and Ju Wenjun, were given byes through to the second round.

Results

Final match

Bracket

References

External links

ChessBase: 2010 Women's World Chess Championship – Preview
FIDE: initial list of qualifiers 
FIDE calendar 2009 with continental and zonal championships standings

Women's World Chess Championships
2010 in chess
Chess in Turkey
Sport in Antakya
2010 in Turkish sport
International sports competitions hosted by Turkey